Clay Foster Lee Jr. is a retired American Bishop of the United Methodist Church, elected in 1988.

Birth and family
Clay was born 2 March 1930 in Laurel, Mississippi.  On 27 May 1951 he married Dorothy “Dot” Stricklin (who was born 14 January 1932).  They have five children:  Cecilia Ann Lee, Jack Stricklin Lee, Lisa Margaret Lee Mullins, Timothy Clay Lee, and Melanie Kay Lee Bernheim.  Bishop and Mrs. Lee also have eight grandchildren.

Education
Clay attended Laurel, Mississippi public schools, graduating from R.H. Watkins High School.  He was the recipient of the Lauren Eastman Rogers Award as Honor Student for the entire school.  He earned his B.A. degree from Millsaps College in 1951, and his Bachelor of Divinity degree from Emory University’s Candler School of Theology in 1953.  While at Millsaps, he was a member of the Omicron Delta Kappa Leadership Fraternity and received the Galloway Medal in 1951 for the best sermon preached by a ministerial student.

Bishop Lee was awarded the D.D. degree by Millsaps College (1985) and the Doctor of Letters degree by Tennessee Wesleyan College (1990).

Ordained ministry
Clay was ordained deacon by Bishop Arthur J. Moore (1952) and elder by Bishop Marvin A. Franklin (1954).  Rev. Lee's first pastorate was the Unity Charge in the Mississippi Annual Conference of the Methodist Church, which he began serving in 1949.  Subsequently, Rev. Lee served the Capitol Street Church in Jackson as associate pastor; as the pastor of the Raymond Church; The First Methodist Church in Quitman; Galloway Memorial Church as Minister of Evangelism; Philadelphia's First Methodist; and the Leavell Woods Church in Jackson.  Rev. Lee then was appointed the executive director of the Conference Council on Ministry; then as superintendent of the Brookhaven District, and finally as the senior minister of the Galloway Memorial U.M.C. in Jackson.

He was elected delegate to General and Jurisdictional Conferences, 1976–88.

Service to the greater community
Bishop Lee served as a member of the U.M. General Board of Pensions for three quadrennia, serving as president 1992-96 (also Chairperson of the Committee on Disability, 1984–88).  He was a trustee of Millsaps College, 1974-86 (secretary 1980-86).  During 1992–96, he served as chairperson of The Appalachian Development Committee.  Serving on the Mississippi Religious Leadership Conference, he was vice chairperson in 1988.  While in Knoxville he served seven years on the board of directors of The United Way of Greater Knoxville.  He was also the secretary of the Joint Committee on Communications of the U.M. Southeastern and South Central Jurisdictions in 1984, and chairperson 1992–96.

Episcopal ministry
Bishop Lee was elected to the episcopacy July 1988 by the Southeastern Jurisdictional Conference of the U.M. Church.  He was assigned to the Knoxville Episcopal Area.  He is now retired and living in Jackson, Mississippi.

Selected writings
Jesus Never Said Everyone Was Loveable, Abingdon Press. (Bishop Lee's sermons as the 1987 Speaker for "The Protestant Hour" radio broadcasts)

See also
 List of bishops of the United Methodist Church

References
InfoServ, the official information service of The United Methodist Church.  
The Council of Bishops of the United Methodist Church

External links
 Photo of Bishop Lee

Candler School of Theology alumni
1930 births
Living people
United Methodist bishops of the Southeastern Jurisdiction
People from Laurel, Mississippi
American sermon writers